Prescot railway station serves the town of Prescot, Merseyside, England. It is situated on the electrified Liverpool to Wigan Line.  The station, and all trains serving it, are operated by Northern Trains.  It was opened in 1871 by the London and North Western Railway.

Facilities
The station is staffed throughout the day (as is standard with most Merseytravel stations), from 15 minutes prior to the start of service until 23:30 each day (including Sundays).  The ticket office and main buildings are on the northbound platform, with a shelter on the opposite side.  Train running information is provided via timetable posters and digital information screens; there are also customer help points on both platforms.  Step-free access is available to each platform, though the footbridge linking the two has stairs.

It was announced in February 2020 that the station would benefit from a £20million grant towards accessibility improvements to the station and footbridge, including new lifts, accessible toilets and customer information screens.  These works commenced in Spring 2020.

Services
Originally train services on the line consisted of coaches hauled by steam powered locomotives.  During the 1960s, operation of train services was changed to diesel powered multiple unit trains and this continued until May 2015, when electric powered class 319 multiple unit trains began public service on the line.

On Sundays the service is also half-hourly in each direction, with alternate trains running through to Preston and Blackpool.

Gallery

References

External links

Railway stations in the Metropolitan Borough of Knowsley
DfT Category E stations
Former London and North Western Railway stations
Railway stations in Great Britain opened in 1872
Northern franchise railway stations